On 21 April 2015, 40 armed men with National Liberation Army (NLA) patches attacked a border police station located at Gošince, near the Kosovo border. The group tied and beat the policemen manning the outpost and stole weapons and radios. They stayed for a couple of hours, filming the event, and issued a message through an interpreter before leaving.

Background

Skopje government attack

On October 28, 2014, at 22.00, the Macedonian government building was shelled, damaging the walls and roof of the building. No casualties were registered. It has been speculated that the event was linked to the recent proclamation of the so-called "Republic of Ilirida", part of the Greater Albanian project. The projectiles were likely fired from a rocket-propelled grenade (RPG) launcher, likely the same used in the 2007 attack. The National Liberation Army (NLA), the militant organization that fought against the Macedonian government in the Insurgency in the Republic of Macedonia (2001), claimed responsibly for the attack. The organization, in the letter signed by "Kushtrimi" to the government, claimed that the "Hasan Prishtina" elite force hit the government building in a coordinated action. The organization claims it is disconcent with the 2001 Ohrid Agreement.

Assault on Gošince 
On 21 April 2015, a group of 40 armed men with NLA patches attacked a border police station located at Gošince, near the Kosovo border. The group tied the policemen and beat them, then stole their arms and communication devices; they stayed for a couple of hours, filming the event, and before they left for Kosovo, they issued this message through an interpreter: "We are from the National Liberation Army. Tell them that neither Ali Ahmeti nor Nikola Gruevski can save you. We do not want any framework agreement and if we see you here again, we will kill you. We want our own state."

The state issued a statement that this was "a terrorist attack on the state". The police has stepped up security in the area. Gošince is 99% Albanian, and was a site of the Insurgency in the Republic of Macedonia (2001) in which the  fought against the Macedonian government seeking basic rights for the Albanian population in Macedonia.

On 22 April an unofficial police source alleged that the group was led by Xhevair Ademi, while other identified individuals were brothers Erhan and Kadir Bajrami, and a Faruk who managed the attack, all from Gjilan in Kosovo. The identified persons, now numbering five, are known to the Macedonian Security Service, as well as those of the region. According to Pristina media, on 22 April, the attack was claimed by the NLA, signed by "Commander Flamuri".

On 24 April, President Nikola Gruevski was accused by the opposition to have staged the attack. On 26 April, Macedonian police recovered illegal arms from the villages of Gošince, Brest and Malina Mahala. Some of the arms found in Malina Mahala were those stolen in the attack. On 27 April, Osman Sulejman was indicted for the attack, while Mirsad Ndrecaj "Commander NATO" (a Kosovo Liberation Army and NLA veteran) was said by Interior Minister Gordana Jankuloska to have been involved in the attack, having assumed responsibility for the attack.

On 9 June, Macedonian daily newspaper, Dnevnik reported that the OSCE Mission to Skopje had advance knowledge of the Gošince border post attack and that the OSCE Mission did not share this information with the security services.

Aftermath
On 3 May 2015, a bomb was thrown at building of the Democratic Union for Integration, the party established by the NLA leadership. There were no victims or wounded. On 9 May an armed group clashed with police in Kumanovo.

See also
Insurgency in the Republic of Macedonia (2001)
Operation Mountain Storm (2007)
Macedonia inter-ethnic violence (2012)
Smilkovci lake killings (2012)
Skopje government attack (2014)

References

Albanian nationalism in North Macedonia
Attacks in Europe in 2015
2015 crimes in the Republic of Macedonia
Albanian separatism
Albanians in North Macedonia
Lipkovo Municipality
Terrorist incidents in North Macedonia
Attacks on police stations in the 2010s
Kosovo–North Macedonia border
Terrorist incidents in Europe in 2015
Battles and conflicts without fatalities